Granville Swift may refer to:
 Granville P. Swift (1821–1875), California pioneer 
 Granville R. Swift (1870–1949), Virginia politician